The Hungarian Two Tailed Dog Party (MKKP) is a joke political party in Hungary. It was founded in Szeged in 2006, but did not register as an official political party until 2014. The party's main activity is street art, consisting of graffiti, stencils, and posters which parody Hungary's political elite.

Because the party participated in the 2018 Hungarian legislative election, it is eligible to receive government funds, which it spends on the "Rózsa Sándor State Fund Wasting Public Program".

Political activity

Foundation, 2006 and 2010 elections
All of the electoral candidates were called Nagy István ("Stephen Big", Hungarian equivalent of the English John Smith) during the 2006 national and local elections. The name was chosen because Nagy is the single most common surname in Hungary, and István is a very common first name.

The Two Tailed Dog Party was not a registered political party until 2014, though it participated in the 2006 elections. The party platform promises eternal life, world peace, a one-day workweek, two sunsets a day (in assorted colours), lower gravity, free beer, and low taxes. Other electoral pledges have included building a mountain on the Great Hungarian Plain. Party election posters were mostly in Szeged and featuring the candidate István Nagy, who is a two-tailed dog, with slogans such as "He's so cute, surely he isn't going to steal".

The party is on good terms with another joke party, the Fourth Way, which is led by two birds. However, there are some disagreements between them, since Fourth Way plans to abolish bird flu, which is opposed by the Two-tailed Dog Party on the principle of viral rights. On 20 June 2009, the MKKP held a "general" protest with approximately three hundred participants in front of the Hungarian Central Statistical Office (KSH) to demand "Tomorrow should be yesterday!", "Look stupid!" and "Disband!" etc., with a chant of "What do we want? Nothing! When do we want it? Never!".

In 2010, the party announced their candidacy for mayor of Budapest with the main slogan "Let everything be better!". Campaign slogans include "More everything, less nothing!", "Eternal life, free beer, tax-deduction!" and "We promise anything!". In Erzsébetváros (District VII, Budapest), the mayoral candidate of the party was notable stand-up comedian Dániel Mogács, who has carried out a number of awareness-generating actions during the campaign period, including a surreal interview with television host Olga Kálmán (ATV's Straight Talk). However, neither candidate was able to collect the appropriate number of recommendation slips to participate in the election. According to its detailed economic program, MKKP intended to develop Szeged space station into an interplanetary spaceport, which would be used for Pulis' export to Jamaica. The program also contained environmental elements, such as patching the ozone hole, and creation of new species to replace extinct species. The party also proposed establishing trade relations with extraterrestrial life forms, and opening a Hungarian restaurant on Mars to improve the country's image.

Official party 

The party spent most of 2013 trying to finish the official registration process, which new election law made compulsory, so it could start its campaign. The registration was rejected in early 2014 on the grounds of the party's "flippancy". In July 2014, the Supreme Court ruled that this was not a valid reason to reject the party, and the registration process should continue. The MKKP was officially registered on 8 September 2014, only 16 minutes before the deadline for nomination of candidates for the 2014 local elections, so the party was unable to participate in the election.

In June 2015, the ruling Third Orbán Government launched an anti-immigrant poster campaign during the intensifying European migrant crisis, with slogans such as "If you come to Hungary, you cannot take the Hungarians' jobs away!". In response, the Two-tailed Dog Party and the Vastagbőr blog ("Thick Skin") jointly called for an "anti-anti-immigration campaign", and collected more than 33 million HUF (ten times the expected amount) from supporters to set up around 800 billboards parodying those of the government, with  slogans in Hungarian and English such as "Sorry about our Prime Minister" and "Feel free to come to Hungary, we already work in England!".

On 4 February 2016, Medián's poll for the first time registered support for the Hungarian Two-tailed Dog Party, with 1% of the population expressing support.

The Hungarian Two-tailed Dog Party was closely involved in the campaign during the October 2016 migrant quota referendum, mocking the government's anti-immigrant messages and phrases. In response to government posters which read "Did you know?" followed by claimed facts about immigration, the party spent €100,000 of voluntary donations from 4,000 people on posters with satirical slogans, such as "Did you know there's a war in Syria?", "Did you know one million Hungarians want to emigrate to Europe?", "Did you know? The perpetrators in most corruption cases are politicians" and "Did you know? During the Olympics, the biggest danger to Hungarian participants came from foreign competitors". Party leader Gergely Kovács told BBC News that "...What we can do is appeal to the millions in Hungary who are upset by the government campaign. We want them to know they are not alone". The party asked people to cast invalid ballots in the referendum. Eventually, 6% of the voters cast a spoiled ballot.

Shortly before the referendum, the party made a mobile app available for download on its website. The app, called "Vote Invalidly", could be used to take a photo of the spoilt votes and publish it. MKKP received a fine of 832,000 Hungarian forints for releasing the app, because publishing a ballot paper is illegal (even though the app published them anonymously). The fine was later reduced to 100,000 Hungarian forints by the decision of the Curia, based on the argument that publishing ballot papers anonymously did not violate the secrecy of the voting, although it was a misuse of the ballot papers.

The party officially took part in the 2018 parliamentary elections and got 1.73% of the total vote, but no seats.

2019 European parliament election 
The party participated in the 2019 European Parliament election. Despite an increase to 2.62% of the votes, it did not win a seat. Its campaign promises included building an overpass above the country for refugees, opening six Nemzeti Dohánybolt stores outside Hungary, introducing mandatory siesta and banning the Eurovision Song Contest.

2019 local elections 
In the 2019 local elections the party ran in four districts of Budapest (II., XII., XIV., XV.) where they had elected one council member each. They also formally or informally supported a handful of mayoral candidates, most notably in Ferencváros and Szombathely. After the election, newly elected Ferencváros mayor Krisztina Baranyi appointed MKKP member Zsuzsanna Döme as one of her deputy mayors.

Street art

The party has been a strong advocate of freedom of expression and artistic license. This position is expressed by political slogans on walls and pasting posters in Szeged.

The party's main activity is street art: graffiti, stencils, and various posters. These are often humorous critiques of company policies, the state of Hungarian railroads, common advertisements, and so forth. There have also been attempts to sabotage large billboard signs or provide simple meta-humour. A party leader was sued by the Hungarian State Railways over stickers saying "Our trains are deliberately dirty" and "Our trains are deliberately late", but the courts ruled in his favor. In 2009 he created a parody of the website Pecs2010.hu (the official site of Pécs as Cultural Capital of Europe in 2010), for which he was threatened with legal action, but the owners of the original site backed down after the case got publicity.

Election results

National Assembly

European Parliament

See also
 List of frivolous political parties

References

External links

Official site
The English version of the official site
Interview The Guardian, 6 January 2016

2006 establishments in Hungary
Joke political parties
Opposition to Viktor Orbán
Political parties established in 2006
Political parties in Hungary